Shri Nawal Kishore Bharatiya Municipal Girls Postgraduate College (N.K.B.M.G Postgraduate College) is situated in Chandausi town of Moradabad district in Uttar Pradesh, India and  it was founded on 6 October 1964, by the Late Nawal Kishore Bharatiya. It is affiliated from M.J.P. Rohilkhand University, Bareilly.

Initially N.K.B.M.G Postgraduate College started graduate classes in Hindi, English, Sanskrit, Economics, Education, Sociology, Political Science, Music Vocal and Music Instrumental. B Ed classes were started in 1973 and those in Home Science were started in 1984. With the beginning of MA classes in Sanskrit and Political Science, the institution became postgraduate college.

College faculty 
 Faculty of Arts
 Faculty of Education
  Faculty of Science
Postgraduate Classes 
 English
 Sanskrit
 Political Science
 Economics 
 Home Science Graduate ClassesEnglish
Sanskrit
Economics
Sociology 
Hindi 
Music - Vocal & Instrumental
Education 
Political Science
Home Science
Science- ZBC & PCM
Physical Education

 Courses 

 Graduate Level BA Hindi Literature
 English Literature
 Sanskrit
 Economics
 Education
 Sociology
 Political Science
 Home Science
 Music Vocal
 Music Instrumental (Tabla)B.Sc Zoology
 Botany
 Chemistry
 Mathematics
 PhysicsB.Ed'''
 Education

Diploma Courses 
 Diploma in Interior Designing
 PG Diploma in Computer Programming

Alumni 
 Anupam Sharma

References

External links 
 Official Website
 Facebook Alumni of NKBMG College

Women's universities and colleges in Uttar Pradesh
Education in Moradabad
Educational institutions established in 1964
1964 establishments in Uttar Pradesh
Postgraduate colleges in Uttar Pradesh